Diet Pepsi is a diet carbonated cola soft drink produced by PepsiCo, introduced in 1964 as a variant of Pepsi with no sugar. First test marketed in 1963 under the name Patio Diet Cola, it was re-branded as Diet Pepsi the following year, becoming the first diet cola to be distributed on a national scale in the United States.

In the 1960s and 1970s its competition consisted of Tab, produced by The Coca-Cola Company, and The United States represents the largest single market for Diet Pepsi.

History 
Diet Pepsi was originally test marketed in the United States under the name Patio in 1963. Following a positive reception attributed to the shifting dietary habits and preferences among the Baby Boomers at the time, the drink was launched nationally as Diet Pepsi the following year. It became the first diet cola to be distributed on a national scale in the US. Distribution was extended to the United Kingdom in 1983, where it is also referred to as Pepsi Diet.

Distribution has since expanded to other countries around the world; though an alternate name is used in certain countries. In Italy, Czechia, Poland, Argentina, Spain Greece, Turkey,
Russia, Ukraine, and Brazil, the beverage is known as Pepsi Light.

Diet Pepsi competed primarily with The Coca-Cola Company's Tab in the 1960s and 1970s; however, The Coca-Cola Company introduced Diet Coke in 1982, which has since been the principal competing product to Diet Pepsi. As of 2010, Diet Pepsi represented a 5.3 percent share of all carbonated soft drink sales in the United States, and was ranked as the #7 soft drink brand by volume. In the same year, Diet Coke was recorded as having a 9.9 percent market share.

In December 2012, an AP article reported that Diet Pepsi was changing its sweetener to sucralose ahead of a major rebranding of the soft drink set for January 2013. In 2015, some people on Facebook and Twitter expressed their distaste for the new formula. In response, Pepsi revived its aspartame formulation, as "Diet Pepsi Classic Sweetener Blend" for US markets in September 2016, and it was sold alongside the new formula. PepsiCo later announced plans to revert Diet Pepsi's sweetener from sucralose to aspartame. The new formulation was released marketwide on February 25, 2018.

Flavor variations

Additional variations of Diet Pepsi have been introduced over the years, wherein other flavors (such as wild cherry, vanilla, lemon, and lime) have been added to the cola. A caffeine-free version of Diet Pepsi is also produced. In Australia, this variant is known as Pepsi Light Caffeine Free and has a gold label. It's only available in 1.25 litre bottles, and the ingredients are listed as Carbonated Water, Caramel Color, Phosphoric Acid, Aspartame, Sodium Benzoate, Acesulfame Potassium, Flavour (Natural), and Citric Acid.  The availability and brand identification of Diet Pepsi flavor variants varies by country. In addition to Diet Pepsi, PepsiCo also produces the low-calorie colas Pepsi Max and Pepsi Zero Sugar, depending on the country.

Composition

In the United States, Diet Pepsi is marketed as having zero calories, as FDA guidelines categorize products with fewer than five calories per serving to be labeled as containing "zero calories".

Though Diet Pepsi is represented worldwide as a low- or no-calorie beverage, the ingredients comprising its makeup vary in some cases by the country of origin. In the US, its ingredients are recorded as "carbonated water, caramel color, aspartame, phosphoric acid, potassium benzoate (preserves freshness), caffeine, citric acid, natural flavor, acesulfame potassium; phenylketonurics: contains phenylalanine". In Canada, the ingredient listing reads: "carbonated water, caramel color, phosphoric acid, aspartame (124 mg/355 ml, contains phenylalanine), sodium benzoate, caffeine, flavor, acesulfame potassium (32 mg/355ml), citric acid, dimethylpolysiloxane". Comparatively in the UK, Diet Pepsi is listed as consisting of "carbonated water, colour (caramel E150d), flavorings (including caffeine), phosphoric acid, sweeteners (aspartame, acesulfame K), acidity regulator (sodium citrate), preservative (sodium benzoate), citric acid, contains a source of phenylalanine".

The initial formulation of Diet Pepsi was sweetened with the artificial sweetener saccharin, although concerns over saccharin emerged in the 1970s, prompting a shift to an alternative sweetener, aspartame, which was marketed as the brand NutraSweet, in 1983. Aspartame has been the subject of controversy, most notably in 1996 following a 60 Minutes report on concerns alleging that aspartame might be linked to the development of brain tumors in humans. Critics of aspartame have expressed concerns that numerous health risks may be associated with its consumption; however, peer-reviewed comprehensive review articles and independent reviews by governmental regulatory bodies have analyzed the published research on the safety of aspartame and have described it as safe for consumption at current levels. Aspartame has been deemed safe for human consumption by regulatory agencies in their respective countries, including the U.S. Food and Drug Administration (FDA), the U.K. Food Standards Agency, the European Food Safety Authority (EFSA) and Health Canada.

Packaging and logo

When it was first introduced in 1964, Diet Pepsi was packaged in glass bottles, and was also made available in can format. In 1994, Diet Pepsi became the first product to list a "freshness date" on each individual can and bottle, a practice that would later become a widespread standard in the packaged food and beverage industry. As of 2020, the product is distributed in plastic bottles, cans, and glass bottles, as well as via soda fountains in retail operations such as restaurants and convenience stores.

The logo used in the packaging and advertisement of Diet Pepsi has changed multiple times since its original iteration. In October 2008, PepsiCo announced it would be redesigning its logo and re-branding many of its products, including Diet Pepsi. At this time the brand's blue and red Pepsi Globe logo became a series of "smiles," with the central white band arcing at different angles depending on the product. In the case of Diet Pepsi, the logo consisted of the small "smile". Starting in mid-2010, all Pepsi variants, both regular and diet, began using the original "smile" logo.

The Classic Sweetener Blend variety was distinguished by its use of the 2003-2006 wordmark along with the "smile" logo, and a light blue label background in contrast to the modern formulation's silver label. By mid-2017, packages of Classic Sweetener Blend dropped the 2003 wordmark and began using the modernized wordmark instead. With the restoration of aspartame as the main sweetener in the regular version, the alternate label was dropped, and packages bore the title "Classic Diet Pepsi Taste" which is very reminiscent to the  "Coca-Cola Classic" title that was in use from 1985 to 2009, when New Coke received backlash.

Advertising and promotion

While it was initially advertised alongside Pepsi, Diet Pepsi began to be promoted independently in the late 1960s. The first television advertisement to feature Diet Pepsi as a standalone product was "Girlwatchers," which placed focus on the cosmetic aspects of the beverage. The musical jingle from this ad generated popular culture appeal to the extent that it was eventually recorded and played on the radio, and later became a Top 40 hit.

Since its inception, musicians, professional athletes, actors and actresses have been featured prominently in the promotion of Diet Pepsi. In 1985, immediately following Super Bowl XIX, the game's respective quarterbacks, Joe Montana (of the San Francisco 49ers) and Dan Marino (of the Miami Dolphins), met in a hallway of what appeared to be a football stadium. Montana, of the winning 49ers, buys Marino a Diet Pepsi, and Marino promises to buy the drink the next time. A Diet Pepsi advertisement in the same year featured Geraldine Ferraro, the first woman to run for vice-president in the U.S. When the feature film Top Gun was released on home video cassette in 1987, it was promoted via television advertisements – consisting of a Top Gun pilot flying upside down while holding a bottle of Diet Pepsi – which were paid for by Pepsi. In exchange, the film's production studio, Paramount Pictures, included a 60-second Diet Pepsi advertisement on all Top Gun VHS tapes. The resulting cross-promotion was the first of its kind, and after it set record videocassette sales, it was described as "the beginning of a trend" by the Los Angeles Times.

In the late 1980s, Michael J. Fox appeared in commercials for Diet Pepsi, including a memorable commercial that featured him making a robot clone of himself. In that commercial, Fox's girlfriend (played by Lori Loughlin) shows up and accidentally hits Fox with the door, causing him to fall down a chute into the basement. The girlfriend takes the robot clone on a date and leaves the real Fox trapped.

During the early 1990s, R&B singer Ray Charles was featured in a series of Diet Pepsi ads featuring the brand's then-current tagline, "You got the right one, baby!" Supermodel Cindy Crawford became a recurring celebrity endorser for the Diet Pepsi brand at this time as well, beginning with a 1991 television ad in which she purchases a can of the drink from a vending machine on a hot summer day. Cindy Crawford was also brought back in 2002 to introduce a new packaging design for Diet Pepsi, and again in 2005 to promote the revised slogan "Light, crisp, refreshing" with an ad which debuted during Super Bowl XXXIX. In 2005 and 2006, recording artist Gwen Stefani appeared in advertisements related to a campaign in which codes printed underneath Diet Pepsi bottle caps could be redeemed for music downloads on Apple's iTunes Store.

See also
Cola wars
Citrus Blast

References

External links

 
 Nutrition facts listing on pepsiproductfacts.com
 Diet Pepsi packaging variants on USAsoda.com

Diet drinks
PepsiCo cola brands
Products introduced in 1964
Caffeinated soft drinks